Like all municipalities of Puerto Rico, Lares is subdivided into administrative units called barrios, which are roughly comparable to minor civil divisions, (and means wards or boroughs or neighborhoods in English). The barrios and subbarrios, in turn, are further subdivided into smaller local populated place areas/units called sectores (sectors in English). The types of sectores may vary, from normally sector to urbanización to reparto to barriada to residencial, among others. Some sectors appear in two barrios.

List of sectors by barrio

Bartolo

Calle Cirila
Calle Cooperativismo
Calle Los Millonarios
Calle Paraíso
Carretera Los Romero
Carretera Vilella
Cerro Las Avispas
Condominio Alturas de Castañer
Poblado Castañer
Sector Calbache
Sector Grillasca
Sector Guano
Sector La Cuesta
Sector Rábanos
Sector Regino
Sector San Juan Bautista
Tramo Carretera 128
Tramo Carretera 135
Tramo Carretera 431

Buenos Aires

	Carretera Acueducto 
	Finca Magraner 
	Hacienda Delgado 
	La Pepa 
	Sector Alto Grande 
	Sector Jobos Mario
	Sector Jobos 
	Sector La América 
	Sector La Gloria 
	Sector La Matilde 
	Sector Matías 
	Sector Miján 
	Sector Morell 
	Sector Palmasola 
	Sector Tostero
	Tramo Carretera 128 
	Tramo Carretera 129

Callejones

	Arco Iris 
	Berrocal 
	Camino Emau 
	Camino Julito Nieves 
	Carmelo Mercado 
	Copa de Oro 
	Demetrio Otaño 
	El Maná 
	Las Lajas 
	Los Adames 
	Los Chayotes 
	Los Luciano 
	Los Otaño 
	Miro Torres 
	Monchín Rivera 
	Sector Crematorio 
	Sector Cueva Pajita 
	Sector El 21 
	Sector El Taino
	Sector Gregorio Rivera 
	Sector La Gallera 
	Sector La Pista 
	Sector La Sierra 
	Sector Las Campanas 
	Sector León Vega 
	Sector Los Nieves 
	Sector Los Santiago
	Sector Pagán Sector 
	Sector Pedro Colón 
	Sector Zenón Rivera 
	Sico Torres 
	Tramo Carretera 129 
	Tramo Carretera 134 
	Tramo Carretera 454

Espino

	Arco Iris 
	Berrocal 
	Camino Caballito 
	Camino David González
	Camino Emau 
	Camino Herminio Hernández 
	Camino Julito Nieves 
	Carmelo Mercado 
	Copa de Oro 
	Demetrio Otaño 
	El Maná 
	Las Lajas 
	Los Adames 
	Los Chayotes 
	Los Luciano 
	Los Otaño 
	Parcelas Tabonuco 
	Sector Ceiba 
	Sector Cheíto Vega 
	Sector Justo Malo 
	Sector La Cabaña 
	Sector Mameyes 
	Sector Milito Méndez 
	Sector Oliver 
	Sector Raty Guivas
	Sector Tellado 
	Sector Toño Vega 
	Sector Trofy Lares 
	Tramo Carretera 124 (Lado este desde la Ferretería Los Muchachos hasta la residencia del señor Juanma Collazo) 
	Tramo Carretera 124 (Parte oeste desde el negocio Rincón de los Trovadores hasta el Garage de Pepito Collazo) 
	Tramo Carretera 436 
	Urbanización Brisas de Lares

Lares

	Camino Obispo 
	Cuesta Mayía 
	El 25 
	La Sabana Sumidero 
	Las Casetas Capotillo 
	Las Tres Marías 
	Sector Jobos López 
	Sector Jobos Mario 
	Sector La Sierra Tatí 
	Sector Las Minas 
	Sector Los Muros
	Sector Manolo Toledo 
	Sector Miján Parcelas Miría 
	Sector Palmarllano 
	Sector Sierra Miría
	Tramo Carretera 111 
	Tramo Carretera 134 
	Urbanización Villa Palmira

Lares barrio-pueblo

	Aurelio Bernal 
	Avenida Los Patriotas 
	Barriada Arizona 
	Barriada Bajadero 
	Barriada San Felipe  
	Barriada Viera 
	Calle Aldarondo 
	Calle Echegaray 
	Calle El Peligro 
	Calle Emilio Castro Rodríguez 
	Calle Ermita 
	Calle Felipe Arana 
	Calle Hospital 
	Calle La Gallera 
	Calle Molino Calle Muñoz Rivera 
	Calle Palmer 
	Calle Rafael Castro 
	Calle Raúl Gándara 
	Calle San José  
	Calle San Pablo 
	Calle Sócrates González 
	Calle Vilella 
	Calle Villa Independencia 
	Calle Virgilio Acevedo 
	Camino González 
	Camino Henrry Arana 
	Carretera Acueducto 
	Cerro Márquez 
	Condominio Lares Gardens 
	Dr. Pedro Albizu Campos 
	Edificio Parques Platinos 
	Edificio Terrazas El Peligro
	El Leñero 
	Ensanche González 
	Ensanche Sur 
	Extensión Altamira 
	Hacienda Borinquen 
	Población 
	Ramal 111 Interior 
	Ramal 111 Interior (Emisora) 
	Residencial Dr. Francisco Seín 
	Sector Ballajá 
	Sector Barranco 
	Sector Desvío 
	Sector Guajataca 
	Sector Jardín de la Pasión 
	Sector Jayal 
	Sector Jobos 
	Sector La Cuadra 
	Sector La Monserrate 
	Sector La Piedra 
	Sector La Pluma 
	Sector La Sierra 
	Sector Los Torres 
	Sector Mercedes Estades 
	Sector Monte Bello 
	Sector Punta Brava 
	Sector Seburuquillo 
	Tramo Carretera 111 
	Tramo Carretera 124 
	Urbanización Altamira 
	Urbanización Alturas de Borinquen 
	Urbanización Buena Vista Calle Lecaroz 
	Urbanización Buena Vista 
	Urbanización Campo Alegre 
	Urbanización Jardines de Lares 
	Urbanización Monte Bello 
	Urbanización Palmas del Sol 
	Urbanización Villa Borinquen
	Urbanización Villa Seral

La Torre

	Cerro La Torre 
	Comunidad Los Milagros 
	Finca Calcerrada 
	Finca Delgado 
	Finca Ostolaza 
	Finca Silvestrini 
	Hacienda Monserrate Finca Pay Méndez 
	La Paragua
	La Vega Calcerrada
	La Vega de Los Acevedo 
	Las Toldas 
	Puente Blanco 
	Sector Collazo 
	Sector Isleta Camino Arana (Ramal 431) 
	Sector Los Quemaos 
	Sector Mercedes Estades 
	Sector Morell 
	Sector Tosquero 
	Tramo Carretera 128

Mirasol

	Comunidad Los 40
	El Banco 
	La Loma
	La Vega Calcerrada 
	Parcelas Angela Vilella 
	Sector Boquerón

Pezuela

	Hacienda Marrero
	Hacienda Rojas 
	Hacienda Vilella
	La Vega de los Acevedo 
	Maguelles 
	Sector Ezenelías 
	Sector Sisco 
	Tramo Carretera 431

Piletas

	Lito Ramos 
	Palo Pana 
	Sector Aquino 
	Sector Arroyo 
	Sector Bayón 
	Sector Borges 
	Sector Cabán 
	Sector Castro 
	Sector Catalino Rodríguez 
	Sector Club Rotario 
	Sector Coquí 
	Sector Escuela 1 
	Sector Juan Sosa 
	Sector La Pista
	Sector Las Casetas 
	Sector Los López Segarra 
	Sector Núñez 
	Sector Olavarría 
	Sector Pedro Molina 
	Sector Ramón Román 
	Sector Reyes Lugo 
	Sector Segunda Unidad
	Sector Soller 
	Tramo Carretera 453

Pueblo

 Avenida Los Patriotas 
 Hacienda Borinquen 
 Sector Ballajá
 Sector Barranco
 Sector La Cuadra
 Sector La Piedra 
 Sector La Pluma 
 Sector Seburuquillo
 Tramo Carretera 111
 Urbanización Alturas de Borinquen
 Urbanización Campo Alegre
 Urbanización Palmas del Sol

Río Prieto

	Camino Ballester 
	Camino Rullán 
	Cerro Malo 
	Sector Boquilla 
	Sector La Monserrate 
	Sector Los Márquez
	Sector Vélez 
	Sector Vilella
	Tramo Carretera 431

See also

 List of communities in Puerto Rico

References

Lares
Lares